Gymnopilus amarissimus is a species of mushroom in the family Hymenogastraceae.

See also

 List of Gymnopilus species

External links
Index Fungorum

amarissimus
Taxa named by William Alphonso Murrill